Sir Mark Grundy is an English educationalist. He is the CEO and former headteacher of Shireland Collegiate Academy in Smethwick, England. He was knighted in 2006 for his work at both Shireland and George Salter Academy in West Bromwich, as well as his work in ICT.

He oversaw an improvement in GCSE grades at George Salter Academy from 15% of children achieving five A*-C grades in 2003 to 56% in 2005.

References

Schoolteachers from the West Midlands
Heads of schools in England
Knights Bachelor
Year of birth missing (living people)
Living people
Place of birth missing (living people)
People educated at Magnus Church of England School